San Juan National Historic Site in the Old San Juan section of San Juan, Puerto Rico, is a National Park Service-managed historic site which protects and interprets colonial-era forts such as Castillo San Felipe del Morro, bastions, powder houses, and three fourths of the old city wall.

Status 
By a February 14, 1949 decree the site was established, and noted the need to protect the fortifications as monuments as well as preserve their historical and architectural value. Listed on the National Register of Historic Places on October 15, 1966.

On December 6, 1983, the park and La Fortaleza were together designated a World Heritage Site under the name "La Fortaleza and San Juan National Historic Site in Puerto Rico" "because of its outstanding, universal cultural value."  Only 12 national park areas in the United States are considered World Heritage Sites.

San Juan National Historic Site features 
Site includes:
 Castillo San Cristóbal
 Castillo San Felipe del Morro
 City Wall of Old San Juan
 Fortín San Juan de la Cruz (El Cañuelo)

Gallery

See also 

 Old San Juan

References 

 The National Parks: Index 2001-2003. Washington: U.S. Department of the Interior.

External links 

 Official NPS website: San Juan National Historic Site
 pdf maps of the site
 The Forts of Old San Juan:Guardians of the Caribbean, a National Park Service Teaching with Historic Places (TwHP) lesson plan

 
1949 establishments in Puerto Rico
National Register of Historic Places in Puerto Rico
Protected areas established in 1949